The Indycar Grand Prix of Sonoma was an IndyCar Series race held at Sonoma Raceway in Sonoma, California.  The USAC Championship Car circuit raced at the circuit in 1970. In 2005, American open wheel racing returned to the circuit with an IndyCar Series event.  The 2006 event saw rookie Marco Andretti win his first career race. It marked the record youngest winner (19 years, 5 months, 14 days) of a major open-wheel racing event at the time.

The IndyCar Series race utilizes a modified  version of the road course, the same used by AMA Superbike. The circuit includes the carousel, making it longer than the NASCAR layout, but shorter than the full  course. This course uses turn 7a of the NASCAR course, but skips the hairpin prior to the front straight. The dragstrip is used instead of the keyhole, adding a high speed section immediately following the exit of the carousel.

For 2012, the course was altered. The back hairpin used the inner loop instead of the outer loop used by NASCAR. Turn nine was widened by ten feet while turn eleven at the hairpin was extended by 200 feet.

From 2015 to 2018, the race had served as the IndyCar season finale.

It was announced on July 13, 2018, that the Monterey Grand Prix at WeatherTech Raceway Laguna Seca would replace Sonoma for the 2019 IndyCar Series season.

Past winners

Support Race History

References

External links
IndyCar.com race page

 
Sports in Sonoma County, California